The 1938 Stafford by-election was held on 9 June 1938.  The by-election was held due to the succession to the peerage of the incumbent Conservative MP, William Ormsby-Gore.  It was won by the Conservative candidate Peter Thorneycroft.

References

1938 in England
Stafford
Elections in Staffordshire
1938 elections in the United Kingdom
By-elections to the Parliament of the United Kingdom in Staffordshire constituencies
20th century in Staffordshire